Dichanthelium xanthophysum, formerly known as Panicum xanthophysum, common names slender rosette grass, panic grass and slender panic-grass, is a plant found in North America. It is listed as a special concern and believed extirpated in Connecticut. It is listed as endangered in New Jersey and Pennsylvania.

References

xanthophysum
Flora of North America